= National Milk Laboratory Certification Program =

National Milk Laboratory Certification Program — Under a Memorandum of Understanding signed in 1977 with the National Conference on Interstate Milk Shipments, the Food and Drug Administration (FDA) conducts a national certification program for state centralized laboratories that test dairy products for contaminants and residues. The program is part of the NCIMS Grade “A” Milk Safety Program, which is based on the Pasteurized Milk Ordinance (PMO). FDA maintains accreditation of milk laboratories and sample collection surveillance procedures by making triennial on-site evaluations of laboratory facilities and equipment and by testing annually the performance skills of analysts through proficiency testing programs. The FDA also standardizes, evaluates, and certifies state and territorial milk laboratory evaluation officers and state sampling surveillance officers to ensure uniformity across all participating jurisdictions.

In April 2025, the FDA temporarily suspended its proficiency testing program for Grade “A” milk, citing workforce cuts and the decommissioning of the Moffett Center Proficiency Testing Laboratory. Although this program is central to safeguarding testing accuracy, the FDA clarified that routine milk safety testing remained in place under the Pasteurized Milk Ordinance, and industry groups reaffirmed public confidence in milk safety during this period.
